The Cei-Rigotti (also known as the Cei gas rifle) is an early automatic rifle created in the final years of the 19th century by Amerigo Cei-Rigotti, an officer in the Royal Italian Army. Although the rifle was never officially adopted by any military, it was tested extensively by the Italian Army during the lead-up to the First World War.

Description

The rifle was gas operated and had selective fire capabilities (single shots or fully automatic). Available information on this gun is sparse and often contradictory.

According to several publications, the prototype rifle was chambered for the 6.5×52mm Mannlicher–Carcano. The gun was supposedly presented by Cei-Rigotti to his superiors in a private demonstration in 1895. An Italian newspaper reported on this event in 1900. According to another source, a demonstration was actually held publicly in Rome on June 13, 1900, when 300 rounds were fired on full automatic before the gun got so hot it seized up. Yet another source mentions a demonstration in the same year at the Brescia Arsenal.

The British also ordered and tested the gun after this event, but they found it unsuitable. The rifle found at the UK National Firearms Centre in Leeds is chambered in 7.65x53mm Mauser, as is another example found in a U.S. private collection.

One unusual feature of the Cei-Rigotti was its trigger, which extended through a slot across the entirety of the trigger guard. It has been theorized that it was intended to make the weapon easier to operate in heavy gloves, but in reality it is used to release the bolt without accidentally firing the weapon. The trigger guard assembly was also connected to the magazine, and needed to be removed in order for the magazine to be replaced. This magazine is also a major point of contention among military historians, as, since the weapon was reloaded via stripper clips rather than detachable magazine, many argue that it disqualifies the Cei-Rigotti from being classified as an assault rifle. Reportedly, prototypes with magazines up to a capacity of 50 rounds existed, but there is no actual known evidence of this yet, and the most high-capacity magazine that can be seen on the drawings from the period is a two-column one for 30 rounds.

See also

Early automatic rifles
Browning M1918 automatic rifle
Fedorov M1916 Avtomat
Furrer Leichtes Maschinengewehr lMG 25
Huot M1916 automatic rifle

Early self loading rifles
Farquhar-Hill P1918 semi automatic rifle
Fusil Automatique Modèle 1917

References

External links
 Encyclopesarmes
 https://archive.org/stream/generalinformati3541unit#page/212/mode/2up

Automatic rifles
Trial and research firearms of Italy
Rifles of Italy